Partizan is a rural locality (a settlement) in Oktyabrskoye Rural Settlement, Paninsky District, Voronezh Oblast, Russia. The population was 50 as of 2010.

Geography 
Partizan is located on the left bank of the Ikorets River, 22 km southwest of Panino (the district's administrative centre) by road. Toydensky is the nearest rural locality.

References 

Rural localities in Paninsky District